The National Provincial Championship, often simply called the NPC, was an annual promotion and relegation rugby union competition in men's domestic New Zealand rugby. First played during the 1976 season, it was the highest level of competition in New Zealand until Super Rugby launched in 1996. It was organised by New Zealand Rugby (NZR) and ceased following the 2005 season.

The league was restructured into two distinct competitions. The National Provincial Championship would include professional and semi-professional players, and consist of the top fourteen financial and best performing regional teams. For sponsorship reasons it was rebranded as the Air New Zealand Cup. The remaining teams would form a breakaway amateur competition known as the Heartland Championship.

Twenty-eight teams had competed since the inception of the competition in 1976. Auckland were the most successful union with fifteen titles and Bay of Plenty were the inaugural champions. Six other teams had won the title: Canterbury (5), Wellington (4), Otago (2), Counties Manukau (1), Manawatu (1), and Waikato (1).

History

Origins and foundation 
The first form of competition came in 1904 with the introduction of the Ranfurly Shield as a challenge trophy. The fixtures were planned
each year in Wellington at the New Zealand Rugby Football Union annual meeting. An elected representative from each provincial union would submit a list of proposed dates and opponents that ideally wouldn't conflict with their local club competitions. In various parts of the country, regular matches were organised by neighbouring regions for challenge trophies. One of the most prestigious competitions presented in 1946 by Timaru's former mayor, A.E.S. Hanan, was the Hanan Shield. It was contested between Mid Canterbury, South Canterbury, and North Otago. Another notable trophy was the Seddon Shield, which was first challenged in 1906. It was named after the former premier of New Zealand, Richard Seddon and featured representative teams from Buller, Nelson Bays, Marlborough, and the West Coast. In the North Island, starting in the King Country and heading northwards, eleven teams played for the Coronation Shield.

In light of the fact that were so many competitions throughout New Zealand, a national tournament was needed and demanded. In 1972, Barry Smith proposed an inter-provincial competition to the Auckland Rugby Union. Once approved by the union, it was called for discussion at the New Zealand Rugby Football Union annual conference in early 1974. The proposal contained an overview of the scheme and covered matters of finance, travel, sponsorship potential, general implications in respect of club and sub-union competitions, traditional representative matches, international laws and Sunday play. Following a meeting in October 1975, modifications were made and eventually accepted by all provinces. Radio New Zealand was awarded sponsorship rights worth NZD 100,000. They also contributed to the marketing of the new proposed competition that was later followed by Lion Breweries, National Mutual, and Air New Zealand. Teams competed in one of two divisions. The representative performance of each team over the previous five years determined which division they would play in. The premier division was decided by a ranking mechanism and determined Auckland, Bay of Plenty, Canterbury, Counties, Hawke's Bay, Manawatu, Marlborough, North Auckland, Otago, Southland, and Wellington to take part. The remaining provinces, Buller, East Coast, Horowhenua, King Country, Mid Canterbury, Nelson Bays, North Otago, Poverty Bay, South Canterbury, Taranaki, Thames Valley, Waikato, Wairarapa Bush, Wanganui and the West Coast were split into North Island and South Island sub-divisions with the possibility of promotion to the top division.

Teams

Champions

Finals appearances by union 
In the sortable table below, teams are ordered first by number of appearances, then by number of wins, and finally by season of first appearance.

Second-tier champions 
The 2002 season saw the introduction of the Meads Cup and Lochore Cup, which were contested by unions from the second and third divisions respectively. North Otago and Hawke's Bay were the first honourable winners. New Zealand Rugby made the decision to incorporate the trophies in the new Heartland Championship tournament when the National Provincial Championship was discontinued in 2005. The silverware commemorate the names of Sir Brian Lochore and Colin Meads, two legendary international rugby players from New Zealand.

Awards

Player awards

See also 

 Rugby union in New Zealand
 History of rugby union in New Zealand
 List of New Zealand rugby union teams
 Heartland Championship
 National Provincial Championship
 Ranfurly Shield
 Farah Palmer Cup

References

External links 
 Official site

 
Rugby union leagues in New Zealand
Rugby union competitions for provincial teams